Robert Michael Yates (born 19 September 1999) is an English cricketer. He made his List A debut on 6 May 2019, for Warwickshire in the 2019 Royal London One-Day Cup. He made his first-class debut on 14 May 2019, for Warwickshire in the 2019 County Championship. He made his Twenty20 debut on 11 September 2020, for the Birmingham Bears in the 2020 t20 Blast.

References

External links
 

1999 births
Living people
English cricketers
Warwickshire cricketers
Sportspeople from Solihull
English cricketers of the 21st century